Tyrrau Mawr or Craig-las is a subsidiary summit of Cadair Idris in the Snowdonia National Park, in Gwynedd, northwest Wales. It lies to the west of Cyfrwy, and can be climbed by taking a west bearing from the Pony Path at Rhiw Gwredydd. Its north face is a crag, known as Craig-las. Below the crags lies Llyn Cregennen with its small island. The reflection of Craig-las from this lake is one of the famous images associated with Snowdonia.

The summit is grassy and marked by a few stones. To the east of the summit lies the large ancient cairn, Carnedd Lwyd. It is often climbed in combination with Craig-y-llyn.

References

External links
 www.geograph.co.uk : photos of and from Cadair Idris

Llanfihangel-y-Pennant
Mountains and hills of Gwynedd
Mountains and hills of Snowdonia
Hewitts of Wales
Nuttalls